Eagle Hill is an unincorporated community in central Alberta, Canada within Mountain View County. It is reputedly the highest point between Calgary and Edmonton. Its post office first opened in 1904. This community has a CO-OP with gas station and propane, Curling rink, Ball diamonds, a Hall, and a church, Eagle Hill Gospel Mission Church.

References

Localities in Mountain View County